A bamboo is an obsolete unit of length in India and Myanmar.

India
In India, the unit was fixed by the reforms of Akbar the Great (1556–1605) at approximately 12.8 m (42 ft). After Metrication in India in the mid-20th century, the unit became obsolete.

Myanmar
In Myanmar (formerly Burma) it was approximately 3.912 meters (154 in, or 12.86 ft). It was also known as the dha. 
One thousand bamboos = one dain (A dain is sometimes referred to as a "Burmese league") 
One dain = 7 saundaungs

See also
List of customary units of measurement in South Asia

References

Units of length
Customary units in India
Obsolete units of measurement